Littlepage is an English surname. Notable people with the surname include:

Adam Brown Littlepage (1859–1921), American lawyer and politician
Craig Littlepage (born 1951), American college athletics administrator and former basketball player and coach
Jack Littlepage (1894 –1948), American mining engineer who worked in the Soviet Union
Louis Littlepage (1762–1802), American diplomat

English-language surnames